S. Joseph Basil was an Indian civil servant and administrator. He was the administrator of Mahe from  27 November 1974 to 11 November 1975.

References 

 

Year of birth missing
Possibly living people
Administrators of Mahe